Maralovodka (Altıgı-Kubeye) is a rural locality (a settlement) in Ust-Koksinsky District, the Altai Republic, Russia. The population was 232 as of 2016. There are 6 streets.

Geography 
Maralovodka is located 25 km southwest of Ust-Koksa (the district's administrative centre) by road. Kaytanak is the nearest rural locality.

References 

Rural localities in Ust-Koksinsky District